Fredrik A. Kayser (15 April 1924 – 19 August 1968) was a Norwegian furniture designer.

He was born in Bergen, and educated at the Norwegian National Academy of Craft and Art Industry. He was especially known for his designed chairs.

References

Norwegian furniture designers
Businesspeople from Bergen
Oslo National Academy of the Arts alumni
1924 births
1968 deaths